Riksgränsen Station is a railway station located at Riksgränsen near the Norway–Sweden border,  into Sweden. The station opened in 1902 as part of the Ofoten Line and Iron Ore Line, and was the location of the switching between Norwegian and Swedish operations.

The station's official inauguration took place on July 14, 1903, by King Oscar II, Crown Prince Gustaf, Prince Carl and Princess Ingeborg. 

Originally it had a train shed and a locomotive depot and several tracks, but they have later been removed, partly in connection with electrification around 1920. Now (as of 2021) the station is only a train stop with platform and single track, not a technical railway station. It is for signalling purposes considered part of the Norwegian Bjørnfjell Station (2 km away) and there is a Norwegian signal at Riksgränsen station. A part of the platform is under roof inside a snow shelter.

References

External links
Entry at the Norwegian National Rail Administration 
Entry at the Norwegian Railway Club

Railway stations in Norrbotten County
Railway stations on the Ofoten Line
Railway stations on the Iron Ore Line
Railway stations opened in 1902
Norway–Sweden border crossings